Mechanicus may refer to:

Philo of Byzantium (ca. 280 BC – ca. 220 BC), also known as Philo Mechanicus, an ancient Greek engineer and writer
Athenaeus Mechanicus, an ancient Greek author of a book on siegecraft, active 1st century BC
Warhammer 40,000: Mechanicus, a 2018 video game

See also
Mechanic (disambiguation)
Mechanicus Kretz' House, a historic building in Copenhagen, Denmark